Ambrus may refer to:

 Ambrus (name)
 Ambrus, Lot-et-Garonne, a commune in the Lot-et-Garonne department in France
 Ambrus, Ivančna Gorica, a settlement in the Municipality of Ivančna Gorica in Slovenia

See also 
 Ambros (disambiguation)